Peter Mihálik is a Slovak para table tennis player who competes in international table tennis competitions. He is a Paralympic bronze medalist and a four-time European medalist.

Mihálik was a footballer who played in the Czech league at FK Chmel Blšany and was trained by Miroslav Beránek. In July 2001, he became a paraplegic after being involved in a car accident, he had only signed a contract with FK Senica a month earlier.

References

Living people
Sportspeople from Skalica
Paralympic table tennis players of Slovakia
Table tennis players at the 2008 Summer Paralympics
Table tennis players at the 2012 Summer Paralympics
Table tennis players at the 2016 Summer Paralympics
Table tennis players at the 2020 Summer Paralympics
Medalists at the 2020 Summer Paralympics
Date of birth missing (living people)
Slovak footballers
FK Chmel Blšany players
Year of birth missing (living people)
Slovak male table tennis players